Mantracker is a Canadian reality television series that premiered in April 2006 on the Outdoor Life Network (OLN). In the United States, the show airs on the Science Channel.

Series overview

Episodes

Season 1 (2006)

Season 2 (2007)

Season 3 (2008)

Season 4 (2009)
The fourth season premiered on July 26, 2009 on OLN, with an encore on August 1, 2009.

Season 5 (2010)
The series was renewed for a fifth season on August 11, 2010.

Season 6 (2011)

Season 7 (2012)
Mantracker was renewed for a seventh season, that premiered on May 21, 2012. Chad Savage Lenz was announced as the new mantracker at the end of the premiere episode.

References

External links 
  (Canada)
 Mantracker – OLN website (Canada)
 Mantracker – Science Channel website (United States)
  of Terry Grant
 

Lists of reality television series episodes